The Umngot River, also known as the Dawki River and Wah Umngot, is a river which flows through Dawki, a little town located at the bottom of the Jaintia Hills in West Jaintia Hills district in the Indian state of Meghalaya. The town is relatively busy and serves as a trade route between India and Bangladesh.

Environment 
The Umngot, arguably one of India's cleanest rivers, is an important fishing spot for local fishermen. The river sits on the India-Bangladesh border, and a white portion of the river, caused by a rise in the current, marks the unofficial boundary between the two countries.

A suspension bridge, the Dawki Bridge, hangs over the Umngot River. It was constructed in 1932, and is a place of interest.

Projects 
In April 2021, the Meghalaya government took a decision to construct a dam on the river, in view of the shortage of electricity. The project was the proposed 210 MW Umngot Hydroelectric Project, which received loads of backlash and opposition from the local villagers, who feared that its construction would disrupt tourism. The project was eventually scrapped.

References 

Rivers of Meghalaya